von Tunzelmann is a surname. Notable people with the surname include:

Adrienne von Tunzelmann, executive director from New Zealand
Alex von Tunzelmann (born 1977), British historian
Alexander von Tunzelmann (1877–1957), New Zealand sailor and explorer
 Nicholas von Tunzelmann (1828–1900), one of the first European explorers to settle in the town of Queenstown, New Zealand in the 1860s